The Progressive Conservative Party (PCP) was a far-right Australian political party that contested the 1980 federal election. Its stated aims included the reintroduction of the White Australia Policy, an end to Asian immigration to Australia, the cessation of foreign aid, and higher tax concessions to non-working mothers. Its candidates included the former independent Western Australian senator, Syd Negus.

The party was established in October 1979 by Gordon Hardy, a Perth company director. Its policies were listed by The Canberra Times as advocating for a national referendum on Asian immigration to Australia, and a 90 percent cut to foreign aid.

In 1981, the PCP merged with the Australian National Alliance and the Immigration Control Association to form the Progressive Nationalist Party, which claimed a membership of 1,000.

Federal parliament

References

Anti-Asian sentiment in Australia
Anti-immigration politics in Australia
Defunct far right political parties in Australia
Defunct political parties in Australia
1979 establishments in Australia
Political parties established in 1979
1981 disestablishments in Australia
Political parties disestablished in 1981
White nationalist parties